

France
 Afars and Issas
 Commissioner – 
 Dominique Ponchardier, High Commissioner of the Afars and Issas (1969–1971)
 Georges Thiercy, High Commissioner of the Afars and Issas (1971–1974)
 Governing Council – Ali Aref Bourhan, President of the Governing Council (1967–1976)
 Comoros (overseas territory of France)
 High Commissioner – Jacques Mouradian, High Commissioner in the Comoros (1969–1975)
Head of Government – Said Ibrahim Ben Ali, President of the Government Council of the Comoros (1970–1972)

Portugal
 Angola – Camilo Augusto de Miranda Rebocho Vaz, High Commissioner of Angola (1966–1972)
 Cape Verde Islands – Antonio Lopes dos Santos, Governor of the Cape Verde Islands (1969–1974)
 Macau – José Manuel de Sousa e Faro Nobre de Carvalho, Governor of Macau (1966–1974)
Mozambique – Eduardo Arantes e Oliveira, High Commissioner and Governor-General of Mozambique (1970–1972)
Portuguese Timor – José Nogueira Valente Pires, Governor of Portuguese Timor (1968–1972)
 Portuguese São Tomé and Príncipe – António Jorge da Silva Sebastião, High Commissioner of São Tomé and Príncipe (1963–1972)

Spain
 Spanish Sahara (Spanish overseas province)
 José María Pérez de Lema y Tejero, Governor-General of Spanish Sahara (1967–1971)
 Fernando de Santiago y Díaz, Governor-General of Spanish Sahara (1971–1974)

United Kingdom
 Saint Helena and Dependencies 
 Sir Dermod Murphy, Governor of Saint Helena (1968–1971)
 Sir Thomas Oates, Governor of Saint Helena (1971–1976)
 Hong Kong 
 Sir David Clive Crosbie Trench, Governor of Hong Kong (1964–1971)
 Sir Hugh Norman-Walker, Acting Governor of Hong Kong (1971)
 Sir Murray MacLehose, Governor of Hong Kong (1971–1982)

United States
Guam – Carlos Camacho, Governor of Guam (1969–1975)

Colonial governors
Colonial governors
1971